Sve najbolje may refer to:
 Sve najbolje (Mate Bulić), a 2001 greatest hits album by Mate Bulić
 Sve najbolje (Thompson), a 2003 greatest hits album by Thompson